Mary Montagu, Duchess of Montagu (15 July 1689 – 14 May 1751), formerly Lady Mary Churchill, was a British court official and noble, the wife of John Montagu, 2nd Duke of Montagu. She was the youngest surviving daughter of John Churchill, 1st Duke of Marlborough, and his wife, Sarah.

Life 

She married Montagu on 17 March 1705, when he was Earl of Montagu. They had five children:
 Isabella (d. 20 December 1786), who married first William Montagu, 2nd Duke of Manchester, and second Edward Hussey-Montagu, 1st Earl of Beaulieu; there were children from her second marriage only.
 John (1706–1711)
 George (died in infancy)
 Mary (c. 1711 – 1 May 1775), who married George Brudenell, 4th Earl of Cardigan, and had children.
 Edward (27 December 1725 – May 1727)

From 1714 to 1717, the Duchess was a Lady of the Bedchamber to Caroline of Ansbach, then Princess of Wales. She was painted by Sir Godfrey Kneller in 1740. A portrait of her with her husband and daughter was painted in about 1729 by Gawen Hamilton. The duchess is obliquely referred to in Delarivier Manley's 1709 satire, The New Atalantis.

One of those who benefited from the duchess's will was Ignatius Sancho, an African slave whom she took on as a butler following her husband's death. She left him a pension, but, having failed to find an alternative career, he later returned to the service of the Montagu family.

References

1689 births
1751 deaths
17th-century English women
18th-century English women
18th-century English people
English duchesses by marriage
Ladies of the Bedchamber
Montagu family
Spencer family
Daughters of British dukes
Court of George I of Great Britain
Household of Caroline of Brandenburg-Ansbach